In geometry, a triacontagon or 30-gon  is a thirty-sided polygon. The sum of any triacontagon's interior angles is 5040 degrees.

Regular triacontagon 

The regular triacontagon is a constructible polygon, by an edge-bisection of a regular pentadecagon, and can also be constructed as a truncated pentadecagon, t{15}. A truncated triacontagon, t{30}, is a hexacontagon, {60}.

One interior angle in a regular triacontagon is 168 degrees, meaning that one exterior angle would be 12°. The triacontagon is the largest regular polygon whose interior angle is the sum of the interior angles of smaller polygons: 168° is the sum of the interior angles of the equilateral triangle (60°) and the regular pentagon (108°).

The area of a regular triacontagon is (with )

The inradius of a regular triacontagon is

The circumradius of a regular triacontagon is

Construction

As 30 = 2 × 3 × 5, a regular triacontagon is constructible using a compass and straightedge.

Symmetry

The regular triacontagon has Dih30 dihedral symmetry, order 60, represented by 30 lines of reflection. Dih30 has 7 dihedral subgroups: Dih15, (Dih10, Dih5), (Dih6, Dih3), and (Dih2, Dih1). It also has eight more cyclic symmetries as subgroups: (Z30, Z15), (Z10, Z5), (Z6, Z3), and (Z2, Z1), with Zn representing π/n radian rotational symmetry.

John Conway labels these lower symmetries with a letter and order of the symmetry follows the letter. He gives d (diagonal) with mirror lines through vertices, p with mirror lines through edges (perpendicular), i with mirror lines through both vertices and edges, and g for rotational symmetry. a1 labels no symmetry.

These lower symmetries allows degrees of freedoms in defining irregular triacontagons. Only the g30 subgroup has no degrees of freedom but can seen as directed edges.

Dissection

Coxeter states that every zonogon (a 2m-gon whose opposite sides are parallel and of equal length) can be dissected into m(m-1)/2 parallelograms.
In particular this is true for regular polygons with evenly many sides, in which case the parallelograms are all rhombi.  For the regular triacontagon, m=15, it can be divided into 105: 7 sets of 15 rhombs. This decomposition is based on a Petrie polygon projection of a 15-cube.

Triacontagram 
A triacontagram is a 30-sided star polygon. There are 3 regular forms given by Schläfli symbols {30/7}, {30/11}, and {30/13}, and 11 compound star figures with the same vertex configuration.

There are also isogonal triacontagrams constructed as deeper truncations of the regular pentadecagon {15} and pentadecagram {15/7}, and inverted pentadecagrams {15/11}, and {15/13}. Other truncations form double coverings: t{15/14}={30/14}=2{15/7}, t{15/8}={30/8}=2{15/4}, t{15/4}={30/4}=2{15/4}, and t{15/2}={30/2}=2{15}.

Petrie polygons
The regular triacontagon is the Petrie polygon for three 8-dimensional polytopes with E8 symmetry, shown in orthogonal projections in the E8 Coxeter plane. It is also the Petrie polygon for two 4-dimensional polytopes, shown in the H4 Coxeter plane.

The regular triacontagram {30/7} is also the Petrie polygon for the great grand stellated 120-cell and grand 600-cell.

References

Naming Polygons and Polyhedra
triacontagon

Constructible polygons
Polygons by the number of sides